The 1954 UMass Redmen baseball team represented the University of Massachusetts Amherst in the 1954 NCAA baseball season. The Redmen played their home games at Alumni Field. The team was coached by Earl Lorden in his 7th year as head coach at UMass.

The Redmen won the District I to advance to the College World Series, where they were defeated by the Missouri Tigers.

Roster

Schedule

! style="" | Regular Season
|- valign="top" 

|- bgcolor="#ccffcc"
| 1 || April 19 || at  || Gardner Dow Athletic Fields • Storrs, Connecticut || 1–0 || 1–0 || 1–0
|- bgcolor="#ccffcc"
| 2 || April 19 || at Connecticut || Gardner Dow Athletic Fields • Storrs, Connecticut || 1–0 || 2–0 || 2–0
|- bgcolor="#ffcccc"
| 3 || April 24 || at  || Brackett Field • Durham, New Hampshire || 0–7 || 2–1 || 2–1
|- bgcolor="#ccffcc"
| 4 || April 24 || at New Hampshire || Brackett Field • Durham, New Hampshire || 4–0 || 3–1 || 3–1
|- bgcolor="#ffcccc"
| 5 || April 29 ||  || Alumni Field •  Amherst, Massachusetts || 0–3 || 3–2 || 3–1
|-

|- bgcolor="#ffcccc"
| 6 || May 1 || at  || Unknown • Boston, Massachusetts || 3–9 || 3–3 || 3–1
|- bgcolor="#ccffcc"
| 7 || May 5 || at  || Unknown • Boston, Massachusetts || 6–1 || 4–3 || 3–1
|- bgcolor="#ccffcc"
| 8 || May 7 || at  || Unknown • Middlebury, Vermont || 8–5 || 5–3 || 3–1
|- bgcolor="#ccffcc"
| 9 || May 11 || at Coast Guard || Unknown • Boston, Massachusetts || 2–0 || 6–3 || 3–1
|- bgcolor="#ccffcc"
| 10 || May 12 ||  || Alumni Field • Amherst, Massachusetts || 3–0 || 7–3 || 3–1
|- bgcolor="#ffcccc"
| 11 || May 15 ||  || Alumni Field • Amherst, Massachusetts || 1–2 || 7–4 || 3–1
|- bgcolor="#ccffcc"
| 12 || May 17 ||  || Alumni Field • Amherst, Massachusetts || 1–0 || 8–4 || 4–1
|- bgcolor="#ffcccc"
| 13 || May 17 || Rhode Island || Alumni Field • Amherst, Massachusetts || 0–1 || 8–5 || 4–2
|- bgcolor="#ccffcc"
| 14 || May 19 || at  || Unknown • Hartford, Connecticut || 7–3 || 9–5 || 4–2
|- bgcolor="#ccffcc"
| 15 || May 20 ||  || Alumni Field • Amherst, Massachusetts || 4–0 || 10–5 || 4–2
|- bgcolor="#ccffcc"
| 16 || May 31 || Quonset Naval || Alumni Field • Amherst, Massachusetts || 3–2 || 11–5 || 4–2
|-

|-
! style="" | Postseason
|- valign="top" 

|- bgcolor="#ccffcc"
| 17 || June 3 || at  || Pynchon Park • Springfield, Massachusetts || 9–7 || 12–5 || 4–2
|- bgcolor="#ccffcc"
| 18 || June 4 || vs Boston University || Pynchon Park • Springfield, Massachusetts || 2–0 || 13–5 || 4–2
|- bgcolor="#ccffcc"
| 19 || June 5 || vs  || Pynchon Park • Springfield, Massachusetts || 2–0 || 14–5 || 4–2
|-

|- bgcolor="#ffcccc"
| 20 || June 10 || vs Michigan State || Omaha Municipal Stadium • Omaha, Nebraska || 5–16 || 14–6 || 4–2
|- bgcolor="#ccffcc"
| 21 || June 11 || vs Oregon || Omaha Municipal Stadium • Omaha, Nebraska || 5–3 || 15–6 || 4–2
|- bgcolor="#ffcccc"
| 22 || June 12 || vs Missouri || Omaha Municipal Stadium • Omaha, Nebraska || 1–8 || 15–7 || 4–2
|-

References

UMass Minutemen baseball seasons
UMass Redmen baseball
College World Series seasons
UMass